Eurybia may refer to:

 Eurybia (mythology), a sea goddess in Greek mythology
 Eurybia (plant), a genus from the family of asters, daisies, and sunflowers
 Eurybia (butterfly), a genus of metalmark butterflies